Phorcus richardi is a species of sea snail, a marine gastropod mollusk in the family Trochidae, the top snails.

Description
The length of the shell varies between 10 mm and 23 mm. The umbilicate, conoidal shell is olivaceous or yellowish. It is ornamented with obliquely longitudinal tawny stripes. The entire surface is smooth. The conical spire is short. The sutures are deeply impressed. The five whorls are convex, the last one flattened and sloping around the upper part, and very obtusely subangular around the periphery. The large aperture is very oblique. The outer lip is thin, acute, and very narrowly margined with yellow, succeeded by a line of black, within which lies a band (about 2 mm wide) of opaque white. The columella is arcuate above, partly surrounding the umbilicus with a white callus. It is straightened in the middle. The umbilical tract lis arge, white, funnel-shaped, and bounded by a carina.

Distribution
This species occurs in the Mediterranean Sea and the Adriatic Sea.

References

 Payraudeau B. C., 1826: Catalogue descriptif et méthodique des Annelides et des Mollusques de l'île de Corse; Paris pp. 218 + 8 pl.
 Risso A., 1826–1827: Histoire naturelle des principales productions de l'Europe Méridionale et particulièrement de celles des environs de Nice et des Alpes Maritimes Paris, Levrault Vol. 1: XII + 448 + 1 carta [1826]. Vol. 2: VII + 482 + 8 pl. (fiori) [novembre 1827]. Vol. 3: XVI + 480 + 14 pl. (pesci) [settembre 1827]. Vol. 4: IV + 439 + 12 pl. (molluschi) [novembre 1826]. Vol. 5: VIII + 400 + 10 pl. (altri invertebrati) [Novembre 1827] 
 Anton H. E., 1839: Verzeichniss der Conchylien welche sich in der Sammlung von Hermann Eduard Anton befinden; Halle XVI + 110 p
 Bucquoy E., Dautzenberg P. & Dollfus G., 1882–1886: Les mollusques marins du Roussillon. Tome Ier. Gastropodes.; Paris, J.B. Baillière & fils 570 p., 66 pl.
 Pallary P., 1912: Sur la faune de l'ancienne lagune de Tunis; Bulletin de la Société d'Histoire Naturelle de l'Afrique du Nord 4(9): 215–228
 Gofas, S.; Le Renard, J.; Bouchet, P. (2001). Mollusca, in: Costello, M.J. et al. (Ed.) (2001). European register of marine species: a check-list of the marine species in Europe and a bibliography of guides to their identification. Collection Patrimoines Naturels, 50: pp. 180–213

External links
 

richardi
Gastropods described in 1826